Teppei (written: , ,  or ) is a masculine Japanese given name. Notable people with the name include:

, Japanese comedian and television presenter
Teppei Isaka (born 1974), Japanese footballer
 (born 1986), Japanese actor and singer
 (born 1975), Japanese footballer
, Japanese freestyle skier
 (born 1983), Japanese ski jumper
Teppei Teranishi (born 1980), American musician
 (born 1977), Japanese rugby union player
 (born 1975), Japanese footballer
Teppei (wrestler) (born 1976), Japanese professional wrestler
Teppei Tsuchiya (born 1982),  Japanese baseball player

Fictional characters
, protagonist of the visual novel Princess Lover!
, character in the manga series Inubaka
, character in the manga and anime series Kuroko's Basketball
 Teppei Kaneko, character in Pixelberry Studios' Choices: Stories You Play visual storytelling game, in the storyline "Ride or Die: A Bad Boy Romance"

Japanese masculine given names